Anna Marie Rudolfina Neruda (also known as Maria Arlberg or Madame Arlberg-Neruda) (26 March 1840 in Brno – 7 November 1920 in Copenhagen) was a Czech-Swedish violinist.

Born in Brno, Moravia, then part of the Austrian Empire, Neruda came from a musical family. Her grandfather was the noted Bohemian composer Johann Baptist Georg Neruda (1708–1780), and her father, Josef Neruda (1807–1875), was the organist of the cathedral of Brno. One of five children of Josef Neruda, she was the sister of the violinist Wilma Neruda and the cellist Franz Xaver Neruda. She studied with her father and in 1859 joined a family group known as the Neruda Quartet, composed of various Neruda children including older sister Wilma. She performed with her siblings in, among other venues, London (1849), St. Petersburg and Stockholm (1861).  While touring Europe together Wilma and Maria met a number of well-known personalities, including Hans Christian Andersen in Denmark in 1862.

In 1868 in Stockholm she married the opera singer Fritz Arlberg and with him had a son, the singer and actor Hjalmar Arlberg (1869–1941). She ended her career at her marriage and after made only a few appearances.

Maria Neruda died in Copenhagen in 1920.

References

Sources 
Neruda, 1. Vilhelmina (Wilma) Marie Františka in the Nordic Family Book (second edition, 1913)
Neruda, 1. Vilhelmina in the Nordic Family Book (second edition supplement, 1925)
Anna Maria Rudolfina Neruda-Arlberg in Adolf Lindgren and Nils Personne, Swedish Portrait Gallery (1897), volume XXI.  Tone artists and scenic artists

1840 births
1920 deaths
Musicians from Brno
Czech classical violinists
Women classical violinists
19th-century classical violinists
19th-century Czech musicians
19th-century Czech women musicians